Silvanolomus is a genus of beetles in the family Silvanidae, containing the following species:

 Silvanolomus armatulus Blackburn
 Silvanolomus crenicollis Grouvelle
 Silvanolomus denticollis Reitter
 Silvanolomus goughi Halstead
 Silvanolomus inermis Reitter
 Silvanolomus pullus Reitter

References

Silvanidae genera